Pietro Faccini or Facini (1562–1602), was an Italian painter, draughtsman and printmaker. He was active near his birthplace of Bologna working in a style bridging Mannerism and the nascent Baroque.

Life
Born in Bologna he only started to study painting when he was already older.  He was initially involved in commerce but apprenticed in the Carracci academy with Ludovico and Annibale Carracci commencing around 1583. In 1594, he left the Carracci academy and set up his own academy possibly to develop his own style.

Annibale Castelli, Agostino Masucci, Domenico Maria Mirandola, and Giovanni Maria Tamburini were among his pupils.

Work
His documented painterly output consists of about a dozen works. His style departs from the linear "Roman" quality assumed by his mentors, and has a more sparkling quality, influenced by Tintoretto, Correggio, and Bassano. He was also inspired by the rich color of Venetian painting and the exaggerated forms of Parmigianino. In 1590, he painted the Martyrdom of Saint Lawrence, now in the church of San Giovanni in Monte (Bologna). He completed altarpieces for the Basilica of San Domenico and Santa Maria dei Servi in 1593-1594 and a Nativity scene (Pinacoteca of Bologna).

Faccini likely studied printmaking in the Carracci academy.  He only left a few prints among which the Saint Francis Receiving the Christ Child in the Presence of the Virgin.  The print is lightly etched using fine lines which create an ethereal atmosphere, befitting Francis' heavenly vision.

He was more prolific as a draughtsman working in a variety of media, including pen and ink, watercolor and red chalk.

References

External links

1560s births
17th-century deaths
16th-century Italian painters
Italian male painters
17th-century Italian painters
Painters from Bologna
Italian Mannerist painters